Charles A. Swan (29 May 1838 – 8 January 1914) was a private in the United States Army who was awarded the Medal of Honor for gallantry during the American Civil War. He was awarded the medal on 17 June 1865 for actions performed during the Battle of Selma on 2 April 1865.

Personal life 
Swan was born in Greene County, Pennsylvania on 29 May 1838 to parents Hugh B. Swan and Mary H. Stephenson. He was one of 5 children. When Swan was 16, the family moved to Mount Pleasant, where their farm would eventually become Camp Harlan, where the 4th Iowa Cavalry would be trained and stationed. He married Martha Beach Smith and fathered one child, Hugh Smith Swan. He died on 8 January 1914 in Mount Pleasant, Iowa and is buried in Forest Home Cemetery in Mount Pleasant.

Military service 
Swan enlisted in the Army as a private on 5 January 1864 and was assigned to Company K of the 4th Iowa Cavalry. He was captured by the Confederates on 10 June 1864 in Guntown, Mississippi but was released 5 days later. He was promoted to 6th Sergeant on 1 May 1865 and 5th Sergeant on 1 July 1865. On 2 April 1865, during the Battle of Selma, Swan captured the flag and the flag bearer of the 11th Mississippi Infantry.

Swan's Medal of Honor citation reads:

Swan was discharged from the Army on 8 August 1865 in Atlanta, Georgia. His Medal of Honor was accredited to Pennsylvania.

References 

1838 births
1914 deaths
People from Greene County, Pennsylvania
United States Army Medal of Honor recipients
American Civil War recipients of the Medal of Honor
Union Army soldiers